Viipurin maalaiskunta, is a former municipality in Finland. It consisted of the rural districts around the city of Viipuri.  It was ceded to the Russian Soviet Federative Socialist Republic after Finland's defeat in the Winter War and the Continuation War in the 1940s.

Villages in 1939 
Ahokas, Alasommee, Alasäiniö, Haankylä (also Haka), Hapenensaari, Hämäläinen,  Ihantala, Juustila (also Juustilanjoki), Jyrkilä, Järvelä, Kaipola,  Karppila, Kaukola, Kiiskilä, Kilpeenjoki, Kilpeenjoki–Sydänmaa, Kilpeenjoki–Vakkila,  Konkkala, Korpelanautio, Kurikkala, Kähäri, Kärki, Kärstilä, Lahti, Lavola, Leppälä, Lihaniemi, Lyykylänjärvi, Mannikkala, Mälkki, Naulasaari, Nikoskela, Nuoraa, Näätälä, Pakkainen, Parkaus, Perojoensuu, Pien-Merijoki, Pietilä, Pihkala, Piispansaari,  Porkansaari,  Rapattila, Rasalahti, Repola–Lyykylä, Repola–Tervajoki, Rikkola, Ryysylä, Rääsiälä, Saarela, Samola, Savolainen, Suur-Merijoki, Suurpero, Tali, Terävälä, Tikkala, Tirhiä, Uskila, Uusikartano, Vahvaniemi, Vatikivi, Ventelä,   Ykspää, Ylivesi, Yläsommee, Yläsäiniö

References

External links 
Äikään kartano in Kilpeenjoki village 1902-1910 (swedish)

Populated places in Leningrad Oblast
History of Vyborg
Karelian Isthmus
Former municipalities of Finland